Military Message Handling System (MMHS) is a profile and set of extensions to X.400 for messaging in military environments. It is NATO standard STANAG 4406 and CCEB standard ACP 123. It adds to standard X.400 email support for military requirements such as mandatory access control (i.e. Classified/Secret/Top Secret messages and users, etc.).  In particular it defines a new message format, P772 that is used in place of X.400's interpersonal message formats P2 (1984 standard) and P22 (1988 standard). 

MMHS specifications are implemented by several X.400 vendors, particularly those located in Europe, such as Raytheon UK, Boldon James, Deep-Secure, Thales Group, Nexor, Cassidian and Isode.

Several RFC are supported:

Implementations

See also 
 Defense Message System
 Automated Message Handling System

References

Email